William Vincent Duffy (8 July 1866 – 13 June 1959) was an Australian sportsman who played cricket for Western Australia and football for the  and West Perth Football Clubs in the West Australian Football Association (WAFA). He also umpired at high levels in both sports.

Duffy was born in Doutta Galla, Victoria, but moved to Perth in the late 1880s to coach West Perth in the WACA district cricket competition. He participated in the first tour of the eastern colonies by a Western Australian team in 1893, playing two first-class matches on the tour. Against Victoria in April 1893, he took 5/124 from 31 overs while opening the bowling, the first five-wicket haul by a Western Australian bowler. Duffy had previously played in a first-class game in 1887, a match in Melbourne between "Smokers" and "Non-Smokers". When the WACA Ground opened in 1893, Duffy was appointed curator. He was elected secretary of the West Perth Cricket Club in 1894, and also received a prize for the "best all-round player" at the club for the previous season.

In 1897, Duffy umpired an exhibition game between George Giffen's XI and a Western Australia XVIII, featuring a number of national players, including Joe Darling, Clem Hill, Syd Gregory and Ernie Jones. The Western Mail said he "fulfilled every duty appertaining to the position with the utmost satisfaction to everybody concerned." In 1894, he finished third in the league's goalkicking, with 18 goals for the season, two behind the eventual leader. He also umpired one game in September 1893. In 1928 and 1929, he participated in a "veterans' cricket match" held at the WACA Ground. He later become involved with the Grand Theatre Company, and died in Subiaco in 1959.

References

1866 births
1959 deaths
Australian cricketers
Australian cricket umpires
West Australian Football League umpires
Cricketers from Melbourne
Rovers Football Club players
Australian rules footballers from Melbourne
Western Australia cricketers
West Perth Football Club players